The Scenic Rim Local Heritage Register is a heritage register containing a list of culturally-significant places within the Scenic Rim Region, Queensland, Australia. Under Section 113 of the Queensland Heritage Act 1992, all local government authorities in Queensland must maintain a local heritage register.

On 29 July 2014, the Scenic Rim Council established a local heritage register with 54 places of local cultural significance based on the criteria of the Australia ICOMOS Burra Charter 1999.

References

External links 

 
 

 
Local heritage registers in Queensland
Scenic Rim Region